GE Honda Aero Engines LLC is a joint venture between GE Aviation and Honda Aero based in Cincinnati, Ohio. GE Honda is headed by Melvyn Heard of GE Aviation and Shinji Tsukiyama of Honda Aero. Formed in 2004, the company plans to create jet engines in the  thrust class, suitable for the business aviation industry.

Products
 GE Honda HF120

References

External links
 GE Honda
 GE Aviation
 Honda Aero

Manufacturing companies established in 2004
American companies established in 2004
Multinational aircraft manufacturers
Aircraft engine manufacturers of the United States
Aircraft engine manufacturers of Japan
Manufacturing companies based in Cincinnati
General Electric
Honda
Joint ventures